This list of tallest buildings in Taoyuan City ranks buildings in the Taiwanese city of Taoyuan by height. 

Taoyuan is the fifth largest city of Taiwan and has gradually developed into a modern metropolis in recent years, especially after the approval of the urban planning development of Taoyuan Aerotropolis. Many modern highrises have been built. Many of them are located in the modern central business districts Taoyuan District, as well as the rapid development of Luzhu District, Guishan District, and Bade District in recent years. Currently, the tallest building in Taoyuan is the 38–storey ChungYuet Royal Landmark, which rises  and was completed in 2012.

Tallest buildings in Taoyuan City
An equal sign (=) following a rank indicates the same height between two or more buildings. The "Year" column indicates the year of completion. The list includes only habitable buildings, as opposed to structures such as observation towers, radio masts, transmission towers and chimneys.

Tallest buildings by district

See also
 Skyscraper
 List of tallest buildings
 List of tallest buildings in Taiwan
 List of tallest buildings in Taichung
 List of tallest buildings in Taipei
 List of tallest buildings in Kaohsiung

References

External links
 Tallest Buildings in Taoyuan City on The Skyscraper Center
 Tallest Buildings in Taoyuan City on The Skyscraperpage
 Tallest Buildings in Taoyuan City on Emporis

Taoyuan